The 2000 LPGA Tour was the 51st season since the LPGA Tour officially began in 1950. The season ran from January 13 to November 19. The season consisted of 36 official money events. Karrie Webb won the most tournaments, seven. She also led the money list with earnings of $1,876,853.

The U.S. Women's Open was the first tournament with a purse over $2,000,00 and a winner's share of $500,000. This was the last season that the du Maurier Classic (now known as the Canadian Women's Open) was considered an LPGA major. It was replaced as a major by the Women's British Open in 2001. There were seven first-time winners in 2000: Dorothy Delasin, Sophie Gustafson, Lorie Kane, Laurel Kean, Janice Moodie, Grace Park, and Charlotta Sörenstam.

The tournament results, leaders, and award winners are listed below.

Tournament results
The following table shows all the official money events for the 2000 season. "Date" is the ending date of the tournament. The numbers in parentheses after the winners' names are the number of wins they had on the tour up to and including that event. Majors are shown in bold.

Leaders
Money List leaders

Full 2000 Official Money List

Awards

References

External links
LPGA Tour official site
2000 season coverage at golfobserver.com

LPGA Tour seasons
LPGA Tour